Gardens is the second studio album by Australian punk rock band Sly Withers, released on 11 June 2021 through Dew Process.

Preceded by fourth singles—"Cracks", "Bougainvillea", "Clarkson", and "Breakfast"—Gardens debuted at number 10 on the ARIA Albums Chart, becoming the band's debut chart appearance in their home country.

Recording
Gardens was recorded across various studios in Western Australia, including 
Hopping Mouse Studio in Fremantle, Templeman Audio in Mount Hawthorn, Perth, and at Forensic Audio, in Perth, where it was mastered by Simon Struthers.

Release
Gardens was announced on 7 April 2021, alongside the release of second single "Clarkson".

Promotion

Singles
Gardens was supported by four singles:
 "Cracks" was released on 27 August 2020 as the album's lead single.
 "Bougainvillea" was released on 25 November 2020 as the album's second single.
 "Clarkson" was released on 7 April 2021 as the album's third single.
 "Breakfast" was released on 28 July 2021 as the album's fourth and final single.

Live performances
On 4 June 2021, the band were featured on Triple J's Like a Version segment, where they performed a cover of Coldplay's "The Scientist", alongside a performance of their own song "Clarkson".

Marketing
Alongside the album's announcement, Sly Withers revealed that they had collaborated with West Australian boardmaker Shreadnaught Surfboards, to create a unique surfboard, which would be gifted to a recipient who pre-ordered the album.

Critical reception

Calling it a "bold, widescreen punk epic well worth diving into", Guitar World journalist Matt Doria wrote: "the band wade through a jungle of peaks and valleys across its 12 tracks, ebbing and flowing between heartrending slow-burners and big, mosh-ready punk anthems."

Labelling it "career-defining", Hayden Davies of Pilerats stated that "the album's 12 songs capture the versatility of Sly Withers and their strengths across a broad range of sounds, leaning towards the punkier side of their discography as a start-to-finish record, but still flourishing in touches from elsewhere."

Dylan Marshall of The AU Review  opined: "Gardens is all things Sly Withers. It's a solid and complete 12 songs that will go some way in entrenching the band's place as not only one of Perth's best bands, but more importantly, a front runner in the Australian emo-punk scene."

Mid-year lists

Commercial performance
On 18 June 2021, Gardens debuted at number 10 on the ARIA Albums Chart for the chart dated 21 June, becoming their first appearance on the chart. Gardens furthermore debuted at number 4 on both the ARIA Top 20 Australian Albums Chart and the ARIA Top 20 Vinyl Albums Chart.

Track listing

Personnel
Adapted from the album's liner notes.

Musicians
Sly Withers
 Joel Neubecker – drums, writing 
 Shea Moriarty – bass, backing vocals, writing 
 Jono Mata – guitar, vocals, writing 
 Sam Blitvich – guitar, vocals, writing 

Other musicians
 Matthew Templeman – backing vocals 
 Rachel Carter – backing vocals  
 Lachlan Dowson – backing vocals

Technical
 Matthew Templeman – production 
 Fraser Cringle – drum tech, additional engineering 
 Simon Struthers – mastering

Artwork and design
 Mike Dann – photography
 Annie Walter – design, layout
 Tim Elphick – studio shots

Charts

Release history

References

External links
 

2021 albums
Sly Withers albums
Dew Process albums